Franck Doté (born 15 December 1975) is a Togolese former footballer who played as a striker. He represented Togo at the 1998 and 2000 Africa Cup of Nations.

He is currently an assistant coach for the Togo national football team. After winning their first ever African Nations Championship game against Uganda in the 2020 African Nations Championship he stated, "A historic and satisfying victory for our young players. We pocketed the three points with the manner, extraordinary goals, and spectacular football. I thank the group for being able to react."

References

External links
 

1975 births
Living people
Togolese footballers
Togo international footballers
AS Mangasport players
Dynamic Togolais players
Safa SC players
Lebanese Premier League players
Association football forwards
Togolese expatriate footballers
Expatriate footballers in Gabon
Togolese expatriate sportspeople in Gabon
Expatriate footballers in Lebanon
Togolese expatriate sportspeople in Lebanon
21st-century Togolese people